Empresa de Telecomunicaciones de Cuba S.A. (ETECSA), is the Cuban state company that provides telephony and communications services in Cuba. It is the sole lawful provider of telephony and telecommunications permitted by the Cuban penal code, constituting a communications state monopoly that has 8 million clients, both national and foreign.

History 
Before the emergence of ETECSA, there were 14 comprehensive communications companies on the island that covered the specialties of telephony, radio, mail and press, as well as other specialized national entities. In this category were the companies of Projects, Construction and Assembly, Coaxial Cable, EMTELCUBA and Long Distance.

In 1993, the constitution of ETECSA as a state and commercial entity was authorized. It was officially created on June 28, 1994 as a commercial company with mixed capital between the Cuban State through the company Telefónica Antillana S.A. (51%) and the Mexican company CITEL (49%). and in 1994 it was granted the administrative concession for the provision and commercialization of public telecommunications services.

The merger process lasted from the beginning of 1994 to February 1995, when ETECSA hired all its workers.

In April 1995 CITEL sold 25% of its shares to the Italian STET, which subsequently bought more shares in the Mexican company. Subsequently, the remaining CITEL shares were sold to other Cuban companies.

Since then, the institution has undergone periods of technological change, structure, management systems, strategic orientation and the development of new services.

On December 16, 2003, through Agreement 4996 of the Executive Committee of the Council of Ministers and Decree 275, the concession of ETECSA as a unified telecommunications operator in the country was extended, the merger of the mobile telephone companies Cubacel and C_COM Sus services which would become part of ETECSA. In the same decree law the following is stated:"(...) The main purpose of the merger is to integrate in a single Mixed Company, all activities related to fixed and cellular telephony, as well as other telecommunications services in the country, to ensure the process of investigation, investment, production, provision of services and their commercialization in Cuba and abroad, including the purchase in the foreign market of technical assistance and supplies for production and services, as well as other activities that guarantee the normal functioning of the system and contribute to the national economy freely convertible currencies .. "Since its founding, the company has gained in efficiency and commitment to its users. Its benefits have been diversified and the quality of the technological parameters has risen, managing to increase the number of lines installed and in service, the digitization index and support for the country's socio-economic development.

Also, based on a better organization of work and the multiple training actions that are carried out, its human resources have developed superior management.

On February 4, 2011, the Official Gazette of the Republic of Cuba announced that Cuba had acquired 100% of the shares of the company, which it controlled for the first time in its entirety since 1993. The shares were distributed as follows :

Telefónica Antillana SA: It owns 6,188 class A shares, equivalent to 51.006% of the capital stock.

Rafin SA: It owns 3,276 Class B shares, equivalent to 27.003% of the capital stock.

Universal Trade & Management corporation SA: It owns 1,345 Class B shares, equivalent to 11.086% of the capital stock.

Banco Internacional de Comercio SA: It owns 112 class B shares, equivalent to 0.923% of the capital stock.

Negocios en Telecomunicaciones SA: It owns 464 class B shares, equivalent to 3.825% of the capital stock.

Services 
Among the services provided by ETECSA include basic telephone services (fixed telephony), alternative fixed telephony (TFA), internet, data transmission, fiber-optical, electronic payment through its platform Transfermovily wireless communication. The company provides services for the public, business and state sectors, as well as the millions of tourists and vacationers who travel to the Republic of Cuba.

Since June 4, 2013, Cubans residing on the island were allowed the facilities for public access to the Internet under the Nauta service in 118 centers throughout the country from navigation rooms and public parks. This service had a great impact on the population since until then service was only offered in balnearios, hotels and tourist centers. Juventud Rebelde, official newspaper of the Union de Jovenes Comunistas (UJC), announced that new Internet access services would gradually become available in other public spaces, such as cultural centers, libraries and museums. The cost of Internet access is 25.00 CUP for every 2 hours and 25 minutes in public areas with WiFi connection and in navigation rooms, for access to sites hosted on Cuban servers, in the case of accounts associated with the service.

In 2016, Nauta Hogar began, a major campaign to provide service to Cuban homes. The value is 12.50 CUP per hour, the price is 1.10 CUP per hour, the objective is to bring Internet services closer to everyone, since recently, especially during the coronavirus pandemic, where they have been made various bonuses and promotions to users.

Internet can be accessed through wi-fi zones and navigation rooms, with the Nauta Hogar service, and recently through the 3G and 4G cellular network.

Structure of the commercial network 
ETECSA's current sales channel, through which the company sells and markets telecommunications products, accessories and services, comprises the network of Telepoints, Minipoints, Multiservice Centers and Commercial Offices, within which points of sale can also coexist .

Commercial office.

Telecommunications Multi-service Center.

TelePointe.

Minipointe.

Repair shop.

Commercial office 
The Commercial Office is the first and most important point of contact for ETECSA with users throughout the Cuban territory. In it, the services and products of the company are commercialized, the procedures related to the telephone service and its contractual relationships and comprehensive attention to the user and the population in general.

They are located in central locations and close to the communities it serves, to facilitate access for people.

Services provided:

 Contracting of basic telephone services, ISDN, telegraph and special lines
 Contracting supplementary, value-added and special services.
 Reception and processing of service requests.
 Collection of the utility bill.
 Attention to complaints and suggestions.
 Consultations and commercial information.
 Marketing of telecommunications products and accessories. (*)
 Sale of prepaid phone cards.
 Other direct care services, for example the recharge of prepaid phone cards.

(*) These services are not available in all the Commercial Offices of the country.

In these Commercial Offices you can also carry out the most dissimilar commercial procedures related to the telephone service, such as:

• Change of name of the holder.    

• Change of telephone number.    

• Change of place of equipment.   

• Mounting change.    

• Change of profession.   

• Transfer of the service to another address.   

• Special disconnection and connection.   

• Reconnection.   

• Reinstatement.    

• Installation of extensions.   

• Go private.
    
• Request for supplementary services.    

• Request for international departure (Mixed Rate).   

• Caller ID service request.    

• Insertion in the Telephone Directory.   

• Account status and credits

To make procedures easier from the comfort of your home, you can call 112, a commercial management service, which offers ETECSA residential users the possibility of making requests and commercial procedures related to the telephone service, which do not require the physical presence in the commercial office. In addition, it allows you to know the amount of the invoice and raise complaints or opinions about the offers.

The 112 offers a daily and free assistance that is provided from 8:30 a.m. at 8:00 p.m. in all Cuban provinces, except in the special municipality of Isla de la Juventud.

Multiservice Telecommunications Center 
The Centro Multiservicios de Telecomunicaciones constitutes a way of presenting ETECSA in the market to offer public telecommunications services. It is a category of direct care center with an identity of its own.

They are located, fundamentally, in areas of high concentration of fixed and floating population.

 'Services provided:' 

 Sale of telecommunications products and accessories.
 Sale of prepaid phone cards.
 Sale of prepaid Internet access cards.  '(*)' 
 Hiring the caller ID service.
 Internet access.  '(*)' 
 National and international calls.
 Audioconference.  '(*)' 
 Quick collection of the telephone bill.
 Telephony for the deaf and hard of hearing.  '(*)' 
 Fax transmission and reception
 Photocopying and printing of documents.  '(*)' 
 Marketing of mobile phone services.  '(*)' 

 '(*)'  These services are not available in all the multiservice telecommunications centers in the country.

Telepoint 
The telepoint is ETECSA's most important presence in the market. It is a multiservice telecommunications center that offers the entire range of products and services of the company, with an image of excellence.

It is located in areas of high concentration of fixed and floating population in the provincial capitals, preferably in historical and commercial areas of the cities and, exceptionally, in places selected for their importance.

 'Services provided:' 

 Sale of telecommunications products and accessories.
 Sale of prepaid phone cards and own card recharge.
 Sale of prepaid Internet access cards.  '(*)' 
 Hiring the caller ID service.
 Internet access.  '(*)' 
 Public phone booths for national and international calls.
 Videoconference and audio-conference.
 Quick collection of the telephone bill
 Telephony for the deaf and hard of hearing.
 Fax transmission and reception.
 Photocopying and printing of documents.  '(*)' 
 Marketing of mobile phone services.

 '(*)'  These services are not available in all Telepoints in the country.

Minipoint 
The Mini Points are ETECSA centers located in different parts of the cities for public telecommunications services.

There are two types of infrastructure: the well-known Caddy Phone and Mini-Points, which are a category of Direct Customer Service center with its own identity, and due to the area they occupy, they do not constitute a Telepunto or Multiservice Telecommunications Center.

The Minipoints are distributed throughout Cuba in areas of high concentration of fixed and floating population.

 'Services provided:' 

 Public phone booths for national and international calls.
 Sale of prepaid phone cards.
 Sale of prepaid Internet access cards.  '(*)' 
 Internet access.  '(*)' 
 Quick collection of the telephone bill.
 Fax transmission and reception.  '(*)' 
 Sale of telecommunications products and accessories.  '(*)' 
 Telephony for the deaf and hard of hearing.  '(*)' 

 '(*)'  These services are only in Minipoints selected based on their micro-location.

Repair shop 
It is a modality of direct attention to clients to provide them with the after-sales service for the repair of fixed and mobile telephone terminal equipment marketed by ETECSA that do not have expired the warranty period, as well as the company's own equipment. Minor repairs are also made outside of the warranty period.

Controversies 
On September 25, 2006, it was announced that the president of the company José Antonio Fernández, and the vice minister of Communications Nelson Ferrer, had been fired by the new minister Ramiro Valdés for negligence in controlling the company.

In March 2020, during the coronavirus pandemic; The company urged Cubans to make “reasonable” use of mobile data to avoid a collapse in the island's Internet network, which caused great outrage within a population that is already forced to pay its high prices for the service, without having any other option within Cuba.

See also 
 Telecommunications in Cuba
 Internet in Cuba
 List of mobile network operators of the Americas#Cuba

References

External links
ETECSA - ETECSA Homepage
E-net - ETECSA Web Portal
Cubacel web portal
Telecom Italia SpA sale

Telecommunications companies of Cuba
Mobile phone companies of the Caribbean
Government-owned companies of Cuba
Telecommunications companies established in 1994
1994 establishments in Cuba